Pax Americana (Latin for "American Peace", modeled after Pax Romana and Pax Britannica; also called the Long Peace) is a term applied to the concept of relative peace in the Western Hemisphere and later in the world after the end of World War II in 1945, when the United States became the world's dominant economic and military power. 

In this sense, Pax Americana has come to describe the military and economic position of the United States relative to other nations.  The Marshall Plan, which spent $13 billion after World War II to rebuild the economies of Western Europe, has been described as "the launching of the Pax Americana".

Early period 

The first articulation of a Pax Americana occurred after the end of the American Civil War (in which the United States both quashed its greatest disunity and demonstrated the ability to field millions of well-equipped soldiers utilizing modern tactics) with reference to the peaceful nature of the North American geographical region, and was abeyant at the commencement of the First World War. Its emergence was concurrent with the development of the idea of American exceptionalism. This view holds that the U.S. occupies a special niche among developed nations in terms of its national credo, historical evolution, political and religious institutions, and unique origins. The concept originates from Alexis de Tocqueville, who asserted that the then-50-year-old United States held a special place among nations because it was a country of immigrants and the first modern democracy. From the establishment of the United States after the American Revolution until the Spanish–American War, the foreign policy of the United States had a regional, instead of global, focus. The Pax Americana, which the Union enforced upon the states of central North America, was a factor in the United States' national prosperity. The larger states were surrounded by smaller states, but these had no anxieties: no standing armies to require taxes and hinder labor; no wars or rumors of wars that would interrupt trade; there is not only peace, but security, for the Pax Americana of the Union covered all the states within the federal constitutional republic. According to the Oxford English Dictionary, the first time the phrase appeared in print was in the August 1894 issue of Forum: "The true cause for exultation is the universal outburst of patriotism in support of the prompt and courageous action of President Cleveland in maintaining the supremacy of law throughout the length and breadth of the land, in establishing the pax Americana."

With the rise of the New Imperialism in the Western hemisphere at the end of the 19th century, debates arose between imperialist and isolationist factions in the U.S. Here, Pax Americana was used to connote the peace across the United States and, more widely, as a Pan-American peace under the aegis of the Monroe Doctrine. Those who favored traditional policies of avoiding foreign entanglements included labor leader Samuel Gompers and steel tycoon Andrew Carnegie. American politicians such as Henry Cabot Lodge, William McKinley, and Theodore Roosevelt advocated an aggressive foreign policy, but the administration of President Grover Cleveland was unwilling to pursue such actions. On January 16, 1893, U.S. diplomatic and military personnel conspired with a small group of individuals to overthrow the constitutional government of the Kingdom of Hawaii and establish a Provisional Government and then a republic. On February 15, they presented a treaty for annexation of the Hawaiian Islands to the U.S. Senate, but opposition to annexation stalled its passage. The United States finally opted to annex Hawaii by way of the Newlands Resolution in July 1898.

After its victory in the Spanish–American War of 1898 and the subsequent acquisition of Cuba, Puerto Rico, the Philippines, and Guam, the United States had gained a colonial empire. By ejecting Spain from the Americas, the United States shifted its position to an uncontested regional power, and extended its influence into Southeast Asia and Oceania. Although U.S. capital investments within the Philippines and Puerto Rico were relatively small, these colonies were strategic outposts for expanding trade with Latin America and Asia, particularly China. In the Caribbean area, the United States established a sphere of influence in line with the Monroe Doctrine, not explicitly defined as such, but recognized in effect by other governments and accepted by at least some of the republics in that area. The events around the start of the 20th century demonstrated that the United States undertook an obligation, usual in such cases, of imposing a "Pax Americana". As in similar instances elsewhere, this Pax Americana was not quite clearly marked in its geographical limit, nor was it guided by any theoretical consistency, but rather by the merits of the case and the test of immediate expediency in each instance. Thus, whereas the United States enforced a peace in much of the lands southward from the Nation and undertook measures to maintain internal tranquility in such areas, the United States on the other hand withdrew from interposition in Mexico.

European powers largely regarded these matters as the concern of the United States. Indeed, the nascent Pax Americana was, in essence, abetted by the policy of the United Kingdom, and the preponderance of global sea power which the British Empire enjoyed by virtue of the strength of the Royal Navy. Preserving the freedom of the seas and ensuring naval dominance had been the policy of the British since victory in the Napoleonic Wars. As it was not in the interests of the United Kingdom to permit any European power to interfere in Americas, the Monroe Doctrine was indirectly aided by the Royal Navy. British commercial interests in South America, which comprised a valuable component of the informal empire that accompanied Britain's overseas possessions, and the economic importance of the United States as a trading partner, ensured that intervention by Britain's rival European powers could not engage with the Americas.

The United States lost its Pacific and regionally bounded nature towards the end of the 19th century. The government adopted protectionism after the Spanish–American War and built up the navy, the "Great White Fleet", to expand the reach of U.S. power. When Theodore Roosevelt became President in 1901, he accelerated a foreign policy shift away from isolationism towards foreign intervention which had begun under his predecessor, William McKinley. The Philippine–American War arose from the ongoing Philippine Revolution against imperialism. Interventionism found its formal articulation in the 1904 Roosevelt Corollary to the Monroe Doctrine, proclaiming the right of the United States to intervene in the affairs of weak states in the Americas in order to stabilize them, a moment that underlined the emergent U.S. regional hegemony. By 1900, the United States possessed the world's largest industrial capacity and national income, having surpassed both the United Kingdom and Germany.

Interwar period 

The United States had been criticized for not taking up the hegemonic mantle following the disintegration of Pax Britannica before the First World War and during the interwar period due to the absence of established political structures, such as the World Bank or United Nations which would be created after World War II, and various internal policies, such as protectionism. Though, the United States participated in the Great War, according to Woodrow Wilson:
[...] to vindicate the principles of peace and justice in the life of the world as against selfish and autocratic power and to set up amongst the really free and self-governed peoples of the world such a concert of purpose and of action as will henceforth insure the observance of those principles.
[...] for democracy, for the right of those who submit to authority to have a voice in their own government, for the rights and liberties of small nations, for a universal dominion of right by such a concert of free peoples as shall bring peace and safety to all nations and make the world itself at last free.

The United States' entry into the Great War marked the abandonment of the traditional American policy of isolation and independence of world politics. Not at the close of the Civil War, not as the result of the Spanish War, but in the Interwar period did the United States become a part of the international system. With this global reorganization from the Great War, there were those in the American populace that advocated an activist role in international politics and international affairs by the United States. Activities that were initiated did not fall into political-military traps and, instead, focused on economic-ideological approaches that would increase the American Empire and general worldwide stability. Following the prior path, a precursor to the United Nations and a league to enforce peace, the League of Nations, was proposed by Woodrow Wilson. This was rejected by the American Government in favor of more economic-ideological approaches and the United States did not join the League. Additionally, there were even proposals of extending the Monroe Doctrine to Great Britain put forth to prevent a second conflagration on the European theater. Ultimately, the United States' proposals and actions did not stop the factors of European nationalism spawned by the previous war, the repercussions of Germany's defeat, and the failures of the Treaty of Versailles from plunging the globe into a Second World War.

Between World War I and World War II, America also sought to continue to preserve Pax America as a corollary to the Monroe Doctrine. Some sought the peaceful and orderly evolution of existing conditions in the western hemisphere and nothing by immediate changes. Before 1917, the position of the United States government and the feelings of the nation in respect to the "Great War" initially had properly been one of neutrality. Its interests remained untouched, and nothing occurred of a nature to affect those interests.

The average American's sympathies, on the other hand, if the feelings of the vast majority of the nation had been correctly interpreted, was with the Allied (Entente) Powers. The population of the United States was revolted at the ruthlessness of the Prussian doctrine of war, and German designs to shift the burden of aggression encountered skeptical derision. The American populace saw themselves safeguarding liberal peace in the Western World. To this end, the American writer Roland Hugins stated:
The truth is that the United States is the only high-minded Power left in the world. It is the only strong nation that has not entered on a career of imperial conquest, and does not want to enter on it. [...] There is in America little of that spirit of selfish aggression which lies at the heart of militarism. Here alone exists a broad basis for "a new passionate sense of brotherhood, and a new scale of human values." We have a deep abhorrence of war for war's sake; we are not enamored of glamour or glory. We have a strong faith in the principle of self-government. We do not care to dominate alien peoples, white or colored; we do not aspire to be the Romans of tomorrow or the "masters of the world." The idealism of Americans centers in the future of America, wherein we hope to work out those principles of liberty and democracy to which we are committed. This political idealism, this strain of pacifism, this abstinence from aggression and desire to be left alone to work out our own destiny, has been manifest from the birth of the republic. We have not always followed our light, but we have never been utterly faithless to it.
It was observed during this time that the initial defeat of Germany opened a moral recasting of the world. The battles between Germans and Allies were seen as far less battles between different nations than they represent the contrast between Liberalism and reaction, between the aspirations of democracy and the Wilhelminism gospel of iron.

Modern period 

The modern Pax Americana era is cited by both supporters and critics of U.S. foreign policy after World War II. However, from 1946 to 1992 Pax Americana is considered a partial international order, as it applied only to capitalist bloc countries, being preferable for some authors to speak about a Pax Americana et Sovietica. Many commentators and critics focus on American policies from 1992 to the present, and as such, it carries different connotations depending on the context. For example, it appears three times in the 90-page document, Rebuilding America's Defenses, by the Project for the New American Century, but is also used by critics to characterize American dominance and hyperpower as imperialist in function and basis. From about the mid-1940s until 1991, U.S. foreign policy was dominated by the Cold War, and characterized by its significant international military presence and greater diplomatic involvement. Seeking an alternative to the isolationist policies pursued after World War I, the United States defined a new policy called containment to oppose the spread of communism.

The modern Pax Americana may be seen as similar to the period of peace in Rome, Pax Romana. In both situations, the period of peace was 'relative peace'.  During both Pax Romana and Pax Americana wars continued to occur, but it was still a prosperous time for both Western and Roman civilizations. It is important to note that during these periods, and most other times of relative tranquility, the peace that is referred to does not mean complete peace.  Rather, it simply means that the civilization prospered in their military, agriculture, trade, and manufacturing.

Pax Britannica heritage 

From the end of the Napoleonic Wars in 1815 until the First World War in 1914, the United Kingdom played the role of offshore-balancer in Europe, where the balance of power was the main aim. It was also in this time that the British Empire became the largest empire of all time.  The global superiority of British military and commerce was guaranteed by dominance of a Europe lacking in strong nation-states, and the presence of the Royal Navy on all of the world's oceans and seas. In 1905, the Royal Navy was superior to any two navies combined in the world. It provided services such as suppression of piracy and slavery. In this era of peace, though, there were several wars between the major powers: the Crimean War, the Franco-Austrian War, the Austro-Prussian War, the Franco-Prussian War, and the Russo-Japanese War, as well as numerous other wars. La Belle Époque, William Wohlforth argued, was rather Pax Britannica, Pax Russica and later Pax Germanica, and between 1853 and 1871 it was not Pax of any kind.

During the Pax Britannica, America developed close ties with Britain, evolving into what has become known as a "special relationship" between the two. The many commonalities shared with the two nations (such as language and history) drew them together as allies. Under the managed transition of the British Empire to the Commonwealth of Nations, members of the British government, such as Harold Macmillan, liked to think of Britain's relationship with America as similar to that of a progenitor Greece to America's Rome. Throughout the years, both have been active in North American, Middle Eastern, and Asian countries.

Late 20th century 

After the Second World War, no armed conflict emerged among major Western nations themselves, and no nuclear weapons were used in open conflict.  The United Nations was also soon developed after World War II to help keep peaceful relations between nations and establishing the veto power for the permanent members of the UN Security Council, which included the United States.

In the second half of the 20th century, the USSR and US superpowers were engaged in the Cold War, which can be seen as a struggle between hegemonies for global dominance. After 1945, the United States enjoyed an advantageous position with respect to the rest of the industrialized world. In the Post–World War II economic expansion, the US was responsible for half of global industrial output, held 80 percent of the world's gold reserves, and was the world's sole nuclear power. The catastrophic destruction of life, infrastructure, and capital during the Second World War had exhausted the imperialism of the Old World, victor and vanquished alike. The largest economy in the world at the time, the United States recognized that it had come out of the war with its domestic infrastructure virtually unscathed and its military forces at unprecedented strength. Military officials recognized the fact that Pax Americana had been reliant on the effective United States air power, just as the instrument of Pax Britannica a century earlier was its sea power. In addition, a unipolar moment was seen to have occurred following the collapse of the Soviet Union.

The term Pax Americana was explicitly used by John F. Kennedy in the 1960s, who advocated against the idea, arguing that the Soviet bloc was composed of human beings with the same individual goals as Americans and that such a peace based on "American weapons of war" was undesirable:

I have, therefore, chosen this time and place to discuss a topic on which ignorance too often abounds and the truth too rarely perceived. And that is the most important topic on earth: peace. What kind of peace do I mean and what kind of a peace do we seek? Not a Pax Americana enforced on the world by American weapons of war. Not the peace of the grave or the security of the slave. I am talking about genuine peace, the kind of peace that makes life on earth worth living, and the kind that enables men and nations to grow, and to hope, and build a better life for their children—not merely peace for Americans but peace for all men and women, not merely peace in our time but peace in all time.

Beginning around the Vietnam War, the 'Pax Americana' term had started to be used by the critics of American Imperialism. Here in the late 20th-century conflict between the Soviet Union and the United States, the charge of Neocolonialism was often aimed at Western involvement in the affairs of the Third World and other developing nations. NATO became regarded as a symbol of Pax Americana in West Europe:

Contemporary power 

Currently, the Pax Americana is based on the military preponderance beyond challenge by any combination of powers and projection of power throughout the world's commons—neutral sea, air and space. This projection is coordinated by the Unified Command Plan which divides the world on regional branches controlled by a single command. Integrated with it are global network of military alliances (the Rio Pact, NATO, ANZUS and bilateral alliances with Japan and several other states) coordinated by Washington in a hub-and-spokes system and worldwide network of several hundreds of military bases and installations. Neither the Rio Treaty, nor NATO, for Robert J. Art, "was a regional collective security organization; rather both were regional imperia run and operated by the United States". Former Security Advisor Zbigniew Brzezinski drew an expressive summary of the military foundation of Pax Americana shortly after the unipolar moment:

Besides the military foundation, there are significant non-military international institutions backed by American financing and diplomacy (like the United Nations and WTO). The United States invested heavily in programs such as the Marshall Plan and in the reconstruction of Japan, economically cementing defense ties that owed increasingly to the establishment of the Iron Curtain/Eastern Bloc and the widening of the Cold War.

Being in the best position to take advantage of free trade, culturally indisposed to traditional empires, and alarmed by the rise of communism in China and the detonation of the first Soviet atom bomb, the historically non-interventionist US also took a keen interest in developing multilateral institutions which would maintain a favorable world order among them. The International Monetary Fund and International Bank for Reconstruction and Development (World Bank), part of the Bretton Woods system of international financial management was developed and, until the early 1970s, the existence of a fixed exchange rate to the US dollar. The General Agreement on Tariffs and Trade (GATT) was developed and consists of a protocol for normalization and reduction of trade tariffs.

With the fall of the Iron Curtain, the demise of the notion of a Pax Sovietica, and the end of the Cold War, the US maintained significant contingents of armed forces in Europe and East Asia. The institutions behind the Pax Americana and the rise of the United States unipolar power have persisted into the early 21st century. The ability of the United States to act as "the world's policeman" has been constrained by its own citizens' historic aversion to foreign wars. Though there has been calls for the continuation of military leadership, as stated in "Rebuilding America's Defenses":
The American peace has proven itself peaceful, stable, and durable. It has, over the past decade, provided the geopolitical framework for widespread economic growth and the spread of American principles of liberty and democracy. Yet no moment in international politics can be frozen in time; even a global Pax Americana will not preserve itself. [... What is required is] a military that is strong and ready to meet both present and future challenges; a foreign policy that boldly and purposefully promotes American principles abroad; and national leadership that accepts the United States' global responsibilities.
This is reflected in the research of American exceptionalism, which shows that "there is some indication for [being a leader of an 'American peace'] among the [US] public, but very little evidence of unilateral attitudes". Resentments have arisen at a country's dependence on American military protection, due to disagreements with United States foreign policy or the presence of American military forces.

In the post-communism world of the 21st-century, the French Socialist politician and former Foreign Minister Hubert Védrine describes the US as a hegemonic hyperpower, while the US political scientists John Mearsheimer and Joseph Nye counter that the US is not a "true" hegemony, because it does not have the resources to impose a proper, formal, global rule; despite its political and military strength, the US is economically equal to Europe, thus, cannot rule the international stage. Several other countries are either emerging or re-emerging as powers, such as China, Russia, India, and the European Union.

Joseph Nye discredited the United States as not a "true" hegemony in his 2002 article titled "The New Rome Meets the New Barbarians". His book of the same year he opens: "Not since Rome has one nation loomed so large above the others." And his 1991 book he titled Bound to Lead. Leadership, translated into Greek, renders hegemony; an alternative translation is archia – Greek common word for empire. Having defined the US hegemony as "not true", Nye looks for an analogy to the true empire: Decline, he writes, is not necessarily imminent. "Rome remained dominant for more than three centuries after the peak of its power ...

In fact, there are striking parallels with the early Pax Romana (especially between 189 BC when the supremacy over the Mediterranean was won and the first annexation in 168 BC). Under that Pax Romana other states remained formally independent and very seldom were called "clients". The latter term became widely used only in the late medieval period. Usually, other states were called "friends and allies"—a popular expression under the Pax Americana.

One of the first to use the term Pax Americana was the Advisory Committee on Postwar Foreign Policy. In 1942, the Committee envisaged that the United States may have to supplant the British Empire. Therefore, the United States "must cultivate a mental view toward world settlement after this war which will enable us to impose our own terms, amounting perhaps to a Pax Americana". According to Swen Holdar, the founder of geopolitics Rudolf Kjellen (1864–1922) predicted the era of US global supremacy using the term Pax Americana shortly after World War I. Writing in 1945, Ludwig Dehio remembered that the Germans used the term Pax Anglosaxonica in a sense of Pax Americana since 1918:

The United States, Dehio associates on the same page, withdrew to isolation on that occasion. "Rome, too, had taken a long time to understand the significance of her world role." Two years earlier, with the war still at its peak, the founder of the Paneuropean Union, Richard von Coudenhove-Kalergi, invoked the example of the two-centuries long "Pax Romana" which, he suggested, could be repeated if based on the preponderant US air power:

One of the first criticisms of "Pax Americana" was written by Nathaniel Peffer in 1943:

However, Peffer was not certain that this would not happen: "It is conceivable that ... America might drift into empire, imperceptibly, stage by stage, in a kind of power-politics gravitation." He also noted that America was heading precisely in that direction: "That there are certain stirrings in this direction is apparent, though how deep they go is unclear."

The depth soon became clarified. Two later critics of Pax Americana, Michio Kaku and David Axelrod, interpreted the outcome of Pax Americana: "Gunboat diplomacy would be replaced by Atomic diplomacy. Pax Britannica would give way to Pax Americana." After the war, with the German and British militaries in tatters, only one force stood on the way to Pax Americana: the Soviet Army. Four years after this criticism was written, the Red Army withdrew, paving the way for the unipolar moment. Joshua Muravchik commemorated the event by titling his 1991 article, "At Last, Pax Americana". He detailed:

The following year, in 1992, a US strategic draft for the post-Cold War period was leaked to the press. The person responsible for the confusion, former Assistant Secretary of State, Paul Wolfowitz, confessed seven years later: "In 1992 a draft memo prepared by my office at the Pentagon ... leaked to the press and sparked a major controversy." The draft's strategy aimed "to prevent any hostile power from dominating" a Eurasian region "whose resources would, under consolidated control, be sufficient to generate global power". He added: "Senator Joseph Biden ridiculed the proposed strategy as 'literally a Pax Americana ... It won't work ...' Just seven years later, many of these same critics seem quite comfortable with the idea of a Pax Americana."

The post-Cold War period, concluded William Wohlforth, much less ambiguously deserves to be called Pax Americana. "Calling the current period the true Pax Americana may offend some, but it reflects reality".

The ‘’Pax Americana’’ motif reached its peak in the context of the 2003 Iraq War. The phrase "American Empire" appeared in one thousand news stories over a single six-month period in 2003. Jonathan Freedland observed:

The New York Review of Books illustrated a 2002 piece on US might with a drawing of George Bush togged up as a Roman centurion, complete with shield and spears. Bush's visits to Germany in 2002 and 2006 resulted in further Bush-as-Roman-emperor invective appearing in the German press. In 2006, freelance writer, political satirist, and correspondent for the left-leaning Die Tageszeitung, Arno Frank, compared the spectacle of the visit by Imperator Bush to "elaborate inspection tours of Roman emperors in important but not completely pacified provinces—such as Germania". In September 2002, Boston's WBUR-FM radio station titled a special on US imperial power with the tag "Pax Americana". "The Roman parallel", wrote Niall Ferguson in 2005, "is in danger of becoming something of a cliché." Policy analyst Vaclav Smil titled his 2010 book by what he intended to explain: Why America Is Not a New Rome. The very phenomenon of the Roman-American association became the subject of research for Classicist Paul J. Burton.

Peter Bender, in his 2003 article "America: The New Roman Empire", summarized: "When politicians or professors are in need of a historical comparison in order to illustrate the United States' incredible might, they almost always think of the Roman Empire." The article abounds with analogies:

In 1998, American political author, Charles A. Kupchan, described the world order "After Pax Americana" and the next year "The Life after Pax Americana". In 2003, he announced "The End of the American Era". In 2012, however, he projected: "America's military strength will remain as central to global stability in the years ahead as it has been in the past."

The Russian analyst Leonid Grinin argues that at present and in the nearest future Pax Americana  will remain an effective tool of supporting the world order since the US concentrates too many leadership functions which no other country is able to take to the full extent. Thus, he warns that the destruction of Pax Americana  will bring critical transformations of the World-system with unclear consequences.

American political analyst Ian Bremmer argued that with the election of Donald Trump and the subsequent rise in populism in the west, as well as US withdrawal from international agreements such as the Trans-Pacific Partnership, NAFTA, and the Paris Climate Accords, that the Pax Americana is over.

American imperialism 

American imperialism is a term referring to the cultural & political outcomes or ideological elements of United States foreign policy. Since the start of the Cold War, the United States has economically and/or diplomatically supported friendly foreign governments, including many that overtly violated the civil and human rights of their own citizens and residents.  American imperialism concepts were initially a product of capitalism critiques and, later, of theorists opposed to what they take to be aggressive United States policies and doctrines.

Although there are various views of the imperialist nature of the United States, which describe many of the same policies and institutions as evidence of imperialism, explanations for imperialism vary widely. In spite of such literature, the historians Archibald Paton Thorton and Stuart Creighton Miller argue against the very coherence of the concept. Miller argues that the overuse and abuse of the term "imperialism" makes it nearly meaningless as an analytical concept.

See also 
General Overseas interventions of the United States, Timeline of United States military operations, United States withdrawal from the United Nations, Hyperpower
Doctrines Truman Doctrine, Reagan Doctrine, Clinton Doctrine, Bush Doctrine, Powell Doctrine, Wolfowitz Doctrine, Obama Doctrine
Early concepts Civilizing mission, Platt Amendment, Holy Alliance, Hague Conventions (1899 and 1907)
Modern concepts Bretton Woods system, Cold War (1985–1991), Neoconservatism, Anti-communism , New World Order, War on Terror
Other Messianic democracy, Peace and Truce of God, 9/11 conspiracy theories, American Dream, Global Nightmare, Pax Russica, Documentary film Pax Americana and the Weaponization of Space

References

Further reading 

 
 
 
 Clarke, Peter. The last thousand days of the British empire: Churchill, Roosevelt, and the birth of the Pax Americana (Bloomsbury Publishing, 2010)
 
 
 
 
 
 
 
 Lears, Jackson, "The Forgotten Crime of War Itself" (review of Samuel Moyn, Humane: How the United States Abandoned Peace and Reinvented War, Farrar, Straus and Giroux, 2021, 400 pp.), The New York Review of Books, vol. LXIX, no. 7 (April 21, 2022), pp. 40–42. "After September 11 [2001] no politician asked whether the proper response to a terrorist attack should be a US war or an international police action. [...] Debating torture or other abuses, while indisputably valuable, has diverted Americans from 'deliberating on the deeper choice they were making to ignore constraints on starting war in the first place.' [W]ar itself causes far more suffering than violations of its rules." (p. 40.)
 
 Mee, Charles L. The Marshall Plan: The launching of the pax americana (New York: Simon and Schuster, 1984)

External links 

The end of the Pax Americana? by Michael Lind
Why America Thinks it Has to Run the World by Benjamin Schwarz
It’s Over, Over There: The Coming Crack-up in Transatlantic Relations by Christopher Layne
War in the Contest for a New World Order by Peter Gowan
So it must be for ever by Thomas Meaney
 Instrumental Internationalism: The American Origins of the United Nations, 1940–3 by Stephen Wertheim
What are we there for? by Tom Stevenson
Peter Gowan interview on U.S. foreign policy since 1945, Interview with Against the Grain

Political terminology
Eras of United States history
Latin political words and phrases
Americana
International security
American exceptionalism